Taïm is an Israeli restaurant located at 45 Spring Street (on the corner of Mulberry Street), in NoLita in Manhattan, New York City.  "Taïm" means "tasty" in Hebrew.

The Spring Street location opened in October 2012.  Another location is at 222 Waverly Place (near Perry Street), in the West Village since 2005. There are now 7 other restaurant locations, including 2 restaurants in the Washington, D.C., area as well as a newly opened location in the Park Slope neighborhood of Brooklyn.

Menu

Zagat's reported that Taïm had 'sublime' falafel (deep-fried chickpea balls), rated "'best in NYC' – and maybe 'the USA'".  The falafel comes in several flavors, such as green (parsley and cilantro), red (roasted red peppers), and spicy.  Home-made harissa spices it up, and the falafel is kosher and gluten-free.

The menu also includes tabbouleh, homemade French fries to be dipped in saffron aioli, salad with lemon-mint dressing, smoothies, and hot toasted pita brushed with olive oil and a mixture of sesame, salt, and the herb za'atar (grown on a mountain near Jerusalem).

The chef is Einat Admony, from Bnei Brak, near Tel Aviv, who co-owns it with her husband Stefan Nafziger.

Decor
The restaurant is small. Its decor was described by Zagats as "almost 'literally a hole-in-the-wall'".

Reviews
In 2012, Time Out described Taïm's falafel as "wildly popular."

In 2013, Zagat's gave Taïm a food rating of 26, and a decor rating of 10, and ranked it the # 1 Israeli restaurant in New York City and the # 2 restaurant in NoLita.  The same year, Fodor's described its food as "delicious."

Other establishments
The owners opened trendy offshoot restaurant Balaboosta (the name balaboosta means "the ideal or perfect housewife" in Yiddish) on Mulberry Street, immediately north of Spring Street, in March 2009, which they also operate together.  They also have a food truck called Taïm Mobile, which opened for business in 2011.

See also
 List of kosher restaurants
 List of restaurants in New York City
 List of vegetarian restaurants

References

External links

Israeli-American culture in New York City
Israeli-American history
Israeli restaurants
Jews and Judaism in Manhattan
Milchig restaurants
Middle Eastern-American culture in New York City
Restaurants established in 2005
Restaurants established in 2012
Restaurants in Manhattan
Vegetarian restaurants in the United States
Nolita
2005 establishments in New York City